Carl Spellman (born 6 November 2000) is a professional footballer who plays as a midfielder, most recently for EFL League Two club Tranmere Rovers. He made his first-team debut in a 2-1 defeat by Solihull Moors in the 2017–18 National League.

Career statistics

Club

Notes

References

Living people
2000 births
English footballers
Association football forwards
Tranmere Rovers F.C. players